Čierny Balog (until 1927 also Balog, or Čierny Hronec) is a municipality in Brezno District, in the Banská Bystrica Region of central Slovakia.

History
The village arose after 1882 (1888 mentioned as Feketebalog) by a merge of 13 villages (e.g. Balog, Krám, Dobroč, Dolina). Until 1920, it belonged to Hungary, as part of Zólyom County. It played an important role during World War II, as one of the centers of the anti-Nazi Slovak National Uprising.

Twin towns – sister cities

Čierny Balog is twinned with:
 Týniště nad Orlicí, Czech Republic

See also
Čierny Hron Railway
List of municipalities and towns in Slovakia

References

Genealogical resources
The records for genealogical research are available at the state archive "Státný archiv in Banska Bystrica, Slovakia"

 Roman Catholic church records (births/marriages/deaths): 1656-1896 (parish A)

External links
http://www.ciernybalog.sk
http://www.e-obce.sk/obec/ciernybalog/cierny-balog.html
http://www.muranskaplanina.com/ciernybalog.htm
Surnames of living people in Cierny Balog

Villages and municipalities in Brezno District
Villages in Slovakia merged with other villages